Firgrove is a town in the Western Cape province of South Africa.

References

Suburbs of Cape Town